Underdale is a western suburb of South Australia's capital city Adelaide on Kaurna land.  It sits between Henley Beach Road and the River Torrens. It is largely residential with a very small industrial section on the Eastern side of Holbrook's Road near the river.  
    

Underdale High School sits within the suburb and World Series Cricket icon David Hooke's is one of its alumni along with Australian soccer player Tony Vidmar. 

Australian Bureau of Statistics data from May 2021 identified Adelaide's Western Suburbs as having the lowest unemployment rate in South Australia. 

St Marks Lutheran Church is in Underdale.

History
Underdale Post Office first opened on 1 January 1867 and closed around 1874. It was reopened in 1937 and closed in 1993.

References

See also
List of Adelaide suburbs

Suburbs of Adelaide